John Charles Thomson JP (1866 – 9 April 1934) was a New Zealand politician of the Liberal Party.

Biography

Thomson was born in Invercargill in 1866. He was appointed a Justice of the Peace in 1896. From 1900 to 1903, he was Mayor of Riverton.

He represented the Southland electorate of Wallace from 1902, when he defeated Michael Gilfedder, who was also of the Liberal Party according to Wilson.

In 1919 he was defeated by Adam Hamilton of the Reform Party. He won the seat back in 1922, but retired in 1925, when the seat was again won by Hamilton.

After several years of ill-health, he died at Invercargill on 9 April 1934.  He was 67 years old.

Notes

References

1866 births
1934 deaths
New Zealand Liberal Party MPs
Members of the New Zealand House of Representatives
People from Invercargill
New Zealand MPs for South Island electorates
New Zealand people of Scottish descent
Mayors of places in Southland, New Zealand
Unsuccessful candidates in the 1919 New Zealand general election
New Zealand justices of the peace